Penny Gray (1958–2014) was an Australian field hockey player.

Penny or Penelope Gray may also refer to:
Penny Gray, character in Adventures of Gallant Bess
Penelope Gray, character in The Private Lives of Elizabeth and Essex

See also
Penni Gray, Australian actress